<noinclude>
The Dominicana DC-9 air disaster, also known as the Dominicana de Aviación Santo Domingo DC-9 air disaster, was an international flight that suffered a fatal accident on February 15, 1970. The McDonnell Douglas DC-9-32 crashed shortly after takeoff from Santo Domingo, Dominican Republic en route to San Juan, Puerto Rico. The crash killed all 102 passengers and crew on board.

Aircraft 
The aircraft, a McDonnell Douglas DC-9-32 registered HI-177 (with serial number 47500 and serial 546), was built by McDonnell Douglas the previous year. It had its maiden flight on September 30, 1969. The aircraft was registered HI-177 and delivered to Dominicana on December 16 the same year. The aircraft was powered by two Pratt & Whitney JT8D-7 turbofan engines. It had been in service with Dominicana for less than a month (with only 354 flying hours) when it crashed.

Accident 
The jetliner was on an international flight from Las Américas International Airport near Santo Domingo, to San Juan's Luis Muñoz Marín International Airport. It took off at about 6:30 PM. Two minutes after departure one of its engines lost power. The crew declared an emergency, telling air traffic controllers that the right engine had flamed out, and they requested to immediately return to the airport. While the crew were preparing to turn back toward the airport, the left engine also flamed out. The aircraft then descended until it hit the sea about two miles south of the airport. There were no survivors among the 97 passengers and five crew members on board.

Notable victims
Several famous passengers were among the dead, including:
Former world lightweight boxing champion Carlos Cruz, his wife and their two children.
The coach and eleven players of Puerto Rico women's national volleyball team, who were returning home after a friendly game against the Dominican Republic women's national volleyball team.

Investigation 
There were initially concerns of a terrorist attack as the family of Antonio Imbert Barrera was on board. However, the investigation concluded that the cause of the crash was the sequential failure of both engines caused by fuel pollution due to water ingress. Neither the cockpit voice recorder (CVR) or flight data recorder (FDR) was ever found.

Aftermath 
Eight months before this accident, on June 23, 1969, in Miami, Florida, Dominicana Flight 401 crashed after take-off also due to an engine failure. The Aviation Traders Carvair lost control and crashed into buildings, killing all four people on board as well as six people on the ground.

Immediately after the Santo Domingo crash, Dominicana suspended all operations. Four of the airline's mechanics were reportedly arrested as well. In addition, the United States Federal Aviation Administration (FAA) banned Dominicana aircraft from operating to the United States. The ban was lifted later in the year after Dominicana leased a replacement DC-9 aircraft, to be flown by crews from the Spanish airline Iberia.

Dominicana eventually resumed full services, including to the United States. The airline flew until 1995 when it suspended services indefinitely, finally officially ceasing all operations during 1999.

See also 

 Aviation safety
 List of accidents and incidents involving commercial aircraft
 List of accidents involving sports teams

References

External links 
 Fatal McDonnell Douglas DC-9 Events
Major Aviation Accidents of the Super70s (Archive)

Aviation accidents and incidents in 1970
Airliner accidents and incidents caused by mechanical failure
Aviation accidents and incidents in the Dominican Republic
Accidents and incidents involving the McDonnell Douglas DC-9
Dominicana de Aviación accidents and incidents
1970 in the Dominican Republic
February 1970 events in North America